Sergey Nikolaevich Shishkarev (born on 2 February 1968 in Novorossiysk) is a Russian businessman and political figure. Founder (1993) and President of Delo Group, a transport and logistics holding company. President of the Russian Handball Federation. He served in the of the Russian Federation for three terms, from 1999 to 2011.

Education and military service

Shishkarev entered the Minsk State Institute of Foreign Languages in 1985. After one year of studies he was drafted for military service, joining the Marines of the Northern Fleet.

On the recommendation of his commanders Shishkarev commenced his studies at the Department of Western Languages of the  Military Red Banner Institute of the Ministry of Defense. In 1992 he graduated with honors, majoring as Military Interpreter-Consultant of Portuguese and Hungarian. He holds the rank of Colonel in the reserve.
       
In 2001 Shishkarev became a Candidate of Juridical Sciences with a thesis on the French Police system. Two years later he graduated with honors from the Russian Academy of Public Administration, majoring in state and municipal management and specializing in Finance, Taxation and Credit. In 2010 he defended his doctoral thesis “Legal Order in Prevention of Corruption Realm: Theoretical and Legal Research”, earning a doctorate (Doctor Nauk in Legal Science) degree.

Professional life 
In early 1993 Shikarev founded the Delo Group in the Black Sea port of Novorossiysk. It has grown to be one of the largest holding companies on the market of transport service. It owns stevedore assets in Novorossiysk, out-of-port terminals and railway platforms, specializing in container delivery and oil products transportation.
 
Shishkarev was twice elected to the Board of Directors of the Novorossiysk Commercial Sea Port, Russia's largest commercial sea port operator.

In 1999 Shishkarev was elected a deputy to the State Duma of Russian Federation (3rd convocation) from the 41st electoral district, which includes Novorossiysk. For the 1999–2003 term he held the office of the Deputy-Chairman of Committee on International affairs. He was re-elected in 2003, this time becoming Deputy-Chairman of Committee on Energy, Transport and Communications. On 2 December 2007 he was re-elected for a third term, becoming the Chairman of State Duma Committee on Transport. During his chairmanship, Shishkarev initiated and implemented bills on transport security, road construction and technical inspection of transport vehicles. He also introduced a bill on vehicle registration aimed at reducing corruption within the traffic police.

Since 8 August 2012 was elected a member of Expert Council under the Government of Russian Federation to share his practical theoretical experience to enhance current bills and initiatives.
Since March 2015 is a member of the State commission on Arctic development.

In April 2015 was elected President of the Russian Handball Federation.

Sergey Shishkarev is an author of over 50 bills including a bill on "Traffic Regulations in Russian Federation".
 
In 2000-s Shishkarev was a member of the Expert Advisory Committee under the Chairman of the Accounts Chamber of the Russian Federation. Apart from this, from 2008 to 2011 he held the post of Head of a Delegation of Federal Council of Russian Federation in the Parliamentary Assembly of the Black Sea Economic Cooperation. He advocated for unilateral recognition of Transnistrian independence by Russia.

In 2013-2018 Sergey Shishkarev was a member of the Marine Board under the Government of the Russian Federation as First Deputy Chairman of the Marine Board under the Government of the Russian Federation and the Chairman of the Marine Board Presidium.

Since April 2015 Sergey Shishkarev is President of the Handball Federation of Russia.

In April 2018 Delo Group owned by Sergey Shishkarev completed deal on purchase of 30.75% of Global Ports - the largest operator of container terminals in Russia.

Non-profit organizations 

Shishkarev is engaged in various social projects. He founded the yacht club “The Russian Sea”, also was the founder and chairman of the Board Trustees of the Foundation for Candidates Pool Training - “The State Club” that provided talented people with the possibility to execute research projects, in order to further the creation of a "talent pool" in Russia, he also was the founder and the trustee of the School of Brazilian football in Russia.

Publications 

 Shishkarev S.N. Police System in France: PhD candidate thesis, Moscow, 2001. (Russian: Шишкарев, С. Н. Полицейская система Франции:диссертация кандидата юридических наук: 12.00.14/ Москва, 2001).
 Shishkarev S.N. Legal Fundamentals of Anti-Corruption policy in Russia.  (Russian: Шишкарёв, С.Н. Правовые основы антикоррупционной политики России: история и современность : монография. Москва).
 Shishkarev S.N. Legislative Order in Russian Federation in Fighting Corruption Sphere. 2009.   (Russian: Шишкарёв, С. Н. Правовой порядок Российской Федерации в сфере противодействия коррупции. Москва, 2009).
 Shishkarev S.N. Legislative Backing to Fighting Corruption: International and Russian Experience. 2006.  (Russian: Шишкарёв, С. Н. Законодательное обеспечение борьбы с коррупцией: международный и российский опыт. Москва, 2006). 
 Shishkarev S.N. Anti-Corruption Law Order: Theoretical and Practical Analysis. 2010.  (Russian: Шишкарев, С. Н. Антикоррупционный правовой порядок: теоретико-правовой анализ: монография. Москва, 2010).
 Shishkarev S.N. Conceptual and Legislative Basis of Anti-Corruption Policy. 2010.  (Russian: Шишкарев, С. Н. Концептуальные и правовые основы антикоррупционной политики. Москва, 2010).

Awards 
For his achievements and results in the course of his political and public work, Sergey Shishkarev has been acknowledged by various honors. He has become the Honoree of the Medal of the Order of “Merit for the Motherland” Second Class, got the Medal “300 years of Russian Fleet”, Badge of Honor of Russian State Duma “for Merit in Parliamentarism Development” and other official rewards.   
Conferred rewards for restoration of Eastern Orthodox churches: Order of Russian Orthodox Church of Blessed Knyaz Daniil Moskovskiy III class, Order of Russian Orthodox Church of Reverend Sergiy Radonezhskiy III class.

References 

Living people
1968 births
Russian businesspeople in transport
Third convocation members of the State Duma (Russian Federation)
Fourth convocation members of the State Duma (Russian Federation)
Fifth convocation members of the State Duma (Russian Federation)
Presidents of the Handball Union of Russia